What's Wrong with This Picture? is the second album by the singer-songwriter Andrew Gold. It was released in 1976 on Asylum Records. It includes the hit single "Lonely Boy" which peaked at No. 7 on the Billboard singles chart featuring Linda Ronstadt on backing vocals. The album's artwork reflects its title, mimicking a style of visual puzzle that consists of various logical inconsistencies or paradoxes for the viewer to try to identify.

Reception
''AllMusics]] James Chrispell retrospectively said the album "continued in the same vein as Andrew Gold's first release" and concluded "sophomore jinx aside, this is a very satisfying album."

[[Rolling Stone|''Rolling Stones Ken Tucker called the album "a disappointment" in light of the "fast, smart pop songs" on Gold's first album. He stated that while "Gold's guitar playing remains commanding… inventive and moving" it cannot overcome "the weakness of the material".

Track listing 
All songs written by Andrew Gold, except where noted.

Charts

Personnel
Andrew Gold – vocals, acoustic guitar (8, 9), electric guitar (3, 8, 9, 10), piano (1, 2, 4, 5, 6, 9, 10), electric piano (11), drums (8), bass guitar (8), organ (6, 9), ARP (8), tambourine (1, 4, 6, 10) congas (10), shaker (1), recorder (1), tom tom (10), percussion (8, 9) backing vocals (3, 6, 8, 9, 11)
Kenny Edwards – bass guitar (1, 7, 9, 10, 11), mandolin (4), backing vocals (1, 3, 4, 6, 9, 10, 11)
Brock Walsh – backing vocals (1, 2, 3, 4, 10, 11), electric piano (7), acoustic guitar (11), ARP (4, 7)
Dan Dugmore – steel guitar (4, 11), rhythm guitar (9, 10)
Mike Botts – drums (4, 7, 10, 11), sleigh bells (7)
Peter Asher – backing vocals (3, 9), claves (9), tambourine (11), shaker (11)
Waddy Wachtel – guitar (1, 7, 11) bass guitar (4)
Leland Sklar – bass guitar (2, 3, 6)
Russ Kunkel – drums (1, 2, 3, 6)
Danny Kortchmar – rhythm guitar (3, 7) electric guitar (4)
Linda Ronstadt – backing vocals (7, 9)
Tessie Coen – congas (6, 9)
Don Menza – saxophone (6), shakuhachi (2)
Clarence McDonald – electric piano (9)
Val Garay – backing vocals (3)

Production
Peter Asher – producer
Val Garay – engineer
Greg Ladanyi, Dennis Kirk – assistant engineer

References

1976 albums
Andrew Gold albums
Albums produced by Peter Asher
Asylum Records albums